Cemre Erol (born May 18, 1992 in Ankara) is a Turkish volleyball player. She is 183 cm tall and plays as outside hitter. She started her volleyball life when she was 12. She played for Fenerbahçe Acıbadem, Ted Ankara Kolejliler SK, Nilüfer Belediyespor, and Halkbank SK. Currently, she is playing for Türk Hava Yolları SK .

National team 
 2008 Turkey Youth Girls National Volleyball Team – Balkan Champion / Greece
 2009 Turkey Youth Girls National Volleyball Team – European Championship 5th / Holland
 2009 Turkey Youth Girls National Volleyball Team – World Championship 4th / Thailand
 2011 Turkey Junior Girls National Volleyball Team – Balkan Championship 3rd / Serbia

Club teams 
 2010 Eczacıbaşı Sports Club – Junior Girls Champion of Turkey
 2010 Fenerbahçe Acıbadem
 1.Indesit Champions League 2nd.
 2.Turkey Cup Champion
 3.Turkey Aroma Women's Champion of 1. Division
 2011 Emlak Toki Sports Club – Champion of 2. Division

Education 
 1999–2009 Ankara Gazi University Foundation Primary/Secondary/High School
 2009–2010 Istek Private Acıbadem Schools – High School Graduation
 2012–2014 Anadolu University – Radio TV Programming associate degree
 2014-still Istanbul Bilgi University – Public Relations Bachelor

Gallery

See also 
 Turkish women in sports

References

External links 
 
 

Istanbul Bilgi University alumni
1992 births
Living people
Sportspeople from Ankara
Turkish women's volleyball players
Fenerbahçe volleyballers
21st-century Turkish sportswomen